Changchunqiao is a station on Line 10 of the Beijing Subway. This station opened on December 30, 2012.  It is located a short distance from the Golden Resources Mall, one of the world's largest shopping malls. The station also serves the Yuanda residential district.

Future plan
Changchun Qiao Station is expected to be a transfer station when Line 12 opens.

Station layout 
The station has an underground island platform.

Exits 
There are 3 exits, lettered A, D1, and D2. Exits A and D2 are accessible.

Gallery

References

External links

Railway stations in China opened in 2012
Beijing Subway stations in Haidian District